Friday Night is a Slovenian low-budget film that premiered in theaters across Slovenia in 2000. Directed by Danijel Sraka; written by Beno 'Stef' Torkar; produced by Ales Blatnik and Danijel Sraka. The film received extensive media coverage in Slovenia during filming as a result of being privately financed and having an international crew, when most films from the area were dependent on state funds and local workers.

The crew members brought in from abroad were Mikael Karlmark from Sweden, Roy Kurtluyan from Turkey/United States, Donald L. Painchaud from Canada and James Debbs from the United States.

Summary

High school friends Edi, Marko, Katja, Mateja, and Petra are trying to find their way to graduation. Along the way they encounter extremely hostile teachers, offensive policemen, insane parents, and at one point aliens (?!). Will they succeed in reaching their goal: the ultimate 'be here or die' party?

Film information

Cast
 Primož Rokavc
 Katarina Čas
 Tadej Cepeljnik
 Primož Preksavec
 Tina Cvek
 Manja Plesnar
 Mateja Dominko
 Ales Drolc
 Jernej Kuntner
 Jasna Kuljaj
 Vesna Strehar
 Matej Kralj
 Polona Fabic
 Mladen Bucic
 Roman Zun
 Zoran Smiljanic
 Max Modic
 Drago Razborsek
 Breda Omerza
 Danijel Smon
 Jože Vunsek
 Sonja Pantar
 Andrija Hevka
 Bostjan Regulj
 Marcel Stefancic
 Simona Habic
 Jozef Jarh
 Tomaž Cedilnik

External links
 
 Official website

Notes

2000 films
Slovene-language films
Films set in Slovenia
2000s teen comedy films
Slovenian comedy films
2000 comedy films